or the Sannō Festival, is a major Shinto festival in Tokyo, along with the Fukagawa Matsuri and Kanda Matsuri. The Festival takes place annually in mid-June, but involves a procession called Shinkosai in even-numbered years only; annual celebrations encompass a number of activities and celebrations over a week, including the day-long Shinkosai (also called Jinkosai) parade through Nagatachō, Chiyoda, Tokyo.

See also 
 Culture of Japan
 Japanese calendar
 Japanese festivals
 Festivals in Tokyo 
List of Buddhist festivals

References

External links 
 Official page of the Sannō Matsuri on the Hie Shrine website

Religious festivals in Japan
Festivals in Tokyo
Japanese culture
Shinto festivals
Shinto in Tokyo
Parades in Japan
Spring (season) events in Japan